Lee-Roy Echteld (born 30 September 1968) is a Dutch football manager and former professional player, who most notably played for Heerenveen as a midfielder. He is currently part of the first-team staff of PEC Zwolle

Playing career
Echteld started playing football in youth departments of Ajax and DWS in Amsterdam. He broke through to senior football in 1988 at HFC Haarlem and then played for Heerenveen during a five-year spell. He also played briefly abroad with the French Ligue 1 club Cannes and the Austrian club Austria Lustenau. In 2001, he retired from football at Heracles Almelo.

Echteld also played with the Suriprofs, where he was allowed to participate because of his Surinamese descent. Because his father is of Chinese Surinamese descent, and this was also clearly visible when Echteld was a baby, the Chinese name 'Lee' was added with a dash before 'Roy', which his parents originally wanted to call him.

Managerial career
Echteld became a coach after his playing career and began managing the amateur branch of FC Omniworld. He did an internship at Ajax for the KNVB diploma. In the 2006–07 season he was a youth coach at DoCoS. From 2007, he became active at Blauw-Wit Amsterdam, first as a youth coach and in 2009 as head coach. He then took over as manager of DWV in January 2013. In 2014, he started working as a youth coach at AZ. He took over as manager of Zeeburgia in January 2015, but left that position at the end of 2015, when he was appointed assistant coach of the first team where succeeded Marco van Basten in that position. In the summer of 2018, Echteld left for Paris Saint-Germain to become manager of the reserves competing in the Championnat National 2. In 2019, however, PSG decided to dissolve the second team and Echteld's contract was not renewed.

Echteld was added to the staff of PEC Zwolle in July 2020, where he became responsible for coaching the first-team strikers as well as overseeing the transition of players from under-21 team to first team.

Honours
AZ
 Eerste Divisie: 1997–98

References

Living people
1968 births
Dutch footballers
Association football midfielders
SC Heerenveen players
AS Cannes players
AZ Alkmaar players
RKC Waalwijk players
SC Austria Lustenau players
PEC Zwolle non-playing staff
Footballers from Amsterdam
Dutch expatriate footballers
Expatriate footballers in France
Expatriate footballers in Austria
Dutch expatriate sportspeople in France
Dutch expatriate sportspeople in Austria
Eredivisie players
Eerste Divisie players
Ligue 1 players
Austrian Football Bundesliga players
2. Liga (Austria) players
Heracles Almelo players
HFC Haarlem players
Dutch sportspeople of Surinamese descent
Dutch people of Chinese descent
AFC Ajax players
AFC DWS players
Dutch football managers
Blauw-Wit Amsterdam managers
Paris Saint-Germain F.C. non-playing staff
AZ Alkmaar non-playing staff
Dutch expatriate football managers
Expatriate football managers in France